Deblina Hembram is an Indian Politician from West Bengal and a central committee member of Communist Party of India (Marxist). She was the Minister for Tribal Affairs in the 2006-11 Left Front Ministry.

Personal life and education 
Deblina Hembram is married to Suklal Hembram. She completed her 10th standard in 1988 from Baddi High School, affiliated to West Bengal Board of Secondary Education.

Political career 
Deblina Hembram is a three time MLA from Ranibandh Assembly Constituency. This is a reserved constituency for Scheduled Tribes. She has won from here in 1996, 2006 and 2011 West Bengal Assembly elections. She had to face Anil Hansda of Congress Party in her debut election in Ranibandh and marked a huge victory with a margin of 32,409 votes. In 2006 election she defeated Aditya Kisku of JKP(N) by 10,890 votes. In 2011 assembly elections she defeated Falguni Hembram of All India Trinamool Congress by 6,859 votes.

Assembly Elections 

   

 On 11 December 2012, Deblina Hembram was assaulted by Trinamool Congress legislators inside West Bengal state assembly for speaking up against the chit fund racket scam of ruling party. She was pinned down to the floor and then beaten up by male Trinamool Congress legislators and was immediately hospitalised.
 Deblina Hembram's speech (in her Mother tongue Santhali) against Trinamool Congress at Brigade Parade Ground, Kolkata in February 2019 became an internet sensation.
 She was the candidate of CPI(M) from Jhargram Lok Sabha constituency in 2019 parliament election. She lost the election to Kunar Hembram of Bharatiya Janata Party.

Organisational Leadership 

 In 33rd conference of All India Kisan Sabha she was elected to the All India Kisan Council.
 National Vice President of  All India Democratic Women's Association.

References 

West Bengal MLAs 2006–2011
Women in West Bengal politics
Communist Party of India (Marxist) politicians from West Bengal
21st-century Indian politicians
Living people
Year of birth missing (living people)
West Bengal MLAs 1996–2001
West Bengal MLAs 2011–2016
21st-century Indian women politicians